Gregory John Chaitin (born 25 June 1947)  is an Argentine-American mathematician and computer scientist. Beginning in the late 1960s, Chaitin made contributions to algorithmic information theory and metamathematics, in particular a computer-theoretic result equivalent to Gödel's incompleteness theorem. He is considered to be one of the founders of what is today known as algorithmic (Solomonoff–Kolmogorov–Chaitin, Kolmogorov or program-size) complexity together with Andrei Kolmogorov and Ray Solomonoff. Along with the works of e.g. Solomonoff, Kolmogorov, Martin-Löf, and Leonid Levin, algorithmic information theory became a foundational part of theoretical computer science, information theory, and mathematical logic. It is a common subject in several computer science curricula. Besides computer scientists, Chaitin's work draws attention of many philosophers and mathematicians to fundamental problems in mathematical creativity and digital philosophy.

Mathematics and computer science
He attended the Bronx High School of Science and City College of New York, where he (still in his teens) developed the theory that led to his independent discovery of algorithmic complexity.

Chaitin has defined Chaitin's constant Ω, a real number whose digits are equidistributed and which is sometimes informally described as an expression of the probability that a random program will halt. Ω has the mathematical property that it is definable, with asymptotic approximations from below (but not from above), but not computable.

Chaitin is also the originator of using graph coloring to do register allocation in compiling, a process known as Chaitin's algorithm.

He was formerly a researcher at IBM's Thomas J. Watson Research Center in New York and remains an emeritus researcher. He has written more than 10 books that have been translated to about 15 languages. He is today interested in questions of metabiology and information-theoretic formalizations of the theory of evolution.

Other scholarly contributions
Chaitin also writes about philosophy, especially metaphysics and philosophy of mathematics (particularly about epistemological matters in mathematics). In metaphysics, Chaitin claims that algorithmic information theory is the key to solving problems in the field of biology (obtaining a formal definition of 'life', its origin and evolution) and neuroscience (the problem of consciousness and the study of the mind).

In recent writings, he defends a position known as digital philosophy. In the epistemology of mathematics, he claims that his findings in mathematical logic and algorithmic information theory show there are "mathematical facts that are true for no reason, that are true by accident". Chaitin proposes that mathematicians must abandon any hope of proving those mathematical facts and adopt a quasi-empirical methodology.

Honors
In 1995 he was given the degree of doctor of science honoris causa by the University of Maine. In 2002 he was given the title of honorary professor by the University of Buenos Aires in Argentina, where his parents were born and where Chaitin spent part of his youth. In 2007 he was given a Leibniz Medal by Wolfram Research. In 2009 he was given the degree of doctor of philosophy honoris causa by the National University of Córdoba. He was formerly a researcher at IBM's Thomas J. Watson Research Center and is now a professor at the Federal University of Rio de Janeiro.

Criticism

Some philosophers and logicians disagree with the philosophical conclusions that Chaitin has drawn from his theorems related to what Chaitin thinks is a kind of fundamental arithmetic randomness.
The logician Torkel Franzén criticized Chaitin's interpretation of Gödel's incompleteness theorem and the alleged explanation for it that Chaitin's work represents.

Bibliography
Information, Randomness & Incompleteness (World Scientific 1987) (online)
Algorithmic Information Theory (Cambridge University Press 1987) online
Information-theoretic Incompleteness (World Scientific 1992) (online)
The Limits of Mathematics (Springer-Verlag 1998)
The Unknowable (Springer-Verlag 1999)
Exploring Randomness (Springer-Verlag 2001)
Conversations with a Mathematician (Springer-Verlag 2002)
From Philosophy to Program Size (Tallinn Cybernetics Institute 2003)
Meta Math!: The Quest for Omega (Pantheon Books 2005) (reprinted in UK as Meta Maths: The Quest for Omega, Atlantic Books 2006)
Teoria algoritmica della complessità (G. Giappichelli Editore 2006)
Thinking about Gödel & Turing (World Scientific 2007)
Mathematics, Complexity and Philosophy (Editorial Midas 2011)
Gödel's Way (CRC Press 2012)
Proving Darwin: Making Biology Mathematical (Pantheon Books 2012)

References

Further reading

External links

G J Chaitin Home Page from academia.edu
G J Chaitin Home Page from UMaine.edu in the Internet Archive 
List of publications of G J Chaitin

Video of lecture on "Leibniz, complexity and incompleteness"
 
New Scientist article (March, 2001) on Chaitin, Omegas and Super-Omegas
A short version of Chaitin's proof
Gregory Chaitin extended film interview and transcripts for the 'Why Are We Here?' documentary series
Chaitin Lisp on github

1947 births
Living people
The Bronx High School of Science alumni
City College of New York alumni
Argentine mathematicians
Argentine computer scientists
20th-century American mathematicians
21st-century American mathematicians
American information theorists
IBM employees
Philosophers of mathematics
Epistemologists
Metaphysics writers
American logicians
21st-century American philosophers
Argentine information theorists
Mathematicians from New York (state)